Derek Robert Whitmore (born December 17, 1984) is a former American professional ice hockey forward who played in the National Hockey League (NHL) for the Buffalo Sabres.

Playing career
After playing four seasons at Bowling Green State University, he signed a professional contract with the Sabres on March 26, 2008. On July 14, 2010 he re-signed with the Sabres for one year as a restricted free agent. On July 7, 2011, Whitmore was re-signed to a one-year contract by the Buffalo Sabres. He made his NHL debut with the team on December 20, 2011.

To begin the 2012-13 season, Whitmore signed a try-out contract with the St. John's IceCaps of the AHL, an affiliate, of the Winnipeg Jets. After 7 games, he was released from his agreement and left for Germany signing for the remainder of the campaign with Augsburger Panther of the DEL, on November 28, 2012. Whitmore scored 23 points in 26 games with the Panthers and was rewarded with a one-year contract extension.

On July 7, 2013, Whitmore used an out-clause in his newly signed contract with Augsburger to return to North America with NHL aspirations. He was signed to a one-year AHL contract with the Hershey Bears the following day. In the 2013–14 season, Whitmore was reassigned on loan from the Bears to the Adirondack Phantoms on March 12, 2014.

Whitmore opted to return to Germany in the off-season, signing a one-year contract as a free agent with the Iserlohn Roosters of the DEL on August 26, 2014. In the 2014–15 season with the Roosters, Whitmore although hampered at times through injury, contributed with 16 goals in 35 games.

On May 21, 2015, Whitmore left the Roosters as a free agent to join Austrian club, the Vienna Capitals of the EBEL on a one-year contract. In his one season in Austria, Whitmore appeared in 36 games with the Capitals, providing 19 points.

On July 27, 2016, Whitmore decided to return to Germany and the DEL, agreeing to a one-year deal with the Straubing Tigers.

After three seasons abroad, Whitmore returned to North America as a free agent before agreeing to an ECHL contract with the Reading Royals on August 24, 2017.

Career statistics

Awards and honors

References

External links

1984 births
Living people
Adirondack Phantoms players
American men's ice hockey forwards
Augsburger Panther players
Bowling Green Falcons men's ice hockey players
Buffalo Sabres players
Hershey Bears players
Ice hockey players from New York (state)
Iserlohn Roosters players
Sportspeople from Rochester, New York
Lincoln Stars players
Portland Pirates players
Reading Royals players
Rochester Americans players
St. John's IceCaps players
Straubing Tigers players
Undrafted National Hockey League players
Vienna Capitals players
Waterloo Black Hawks players